Diana Garcia (born August 3, 1950) is an American poet.

Life
She was raised in California and is the oldest of three children. Her parents were migrant field workers who lived in a farm labor camp, California Packing Company Camp #15, when she was born. She graduated from Merced High School in 1968 and attended Fresno State College for one year before leaving college to work and care for her son.
She graduated from San Diego State University with an MFA in Creative Writing. She then was chosen to fill a one-year visiting professorship at Central Connecticut State University.  Upon completion of that one-year contract she was hired as a full-time professor.
She teaches creative writing at California State University, Monterey Bay.

Awards
 2001 American Book Award

Works

 Valley Language (2007)

Anthologies

References

External links
"Fighting Words; CSUMB poet Diana Garcia gives voice to the voiceless.", Monterey County Weekly, May 7, 2003
Hispanic-American poet Diana García reading from her work, 2015, Library of Congress.

1950 births
Living people
American women poets
Poets from California
People from San Joaquin County, California
San Diego State University alumni
California State University, Monterey Bay faculty
Central Connecticut State University faculty
American Book Award winners
American women academics
American poets of Mexican descent
21st-century American women writers